The Lutz-Franklin School is an historic one-room school building which is located in Lower Saucon Township in Northampton County, Pennsylvania.

It was added to the National Register of Historic Places in 2008.

History and architectural features
Built in 1880, this historic school is a one-story, rectangular, stone building with a belfry, and was designed in the Late Victorian style. A front porch was added in 1901. The building measures thirty-two feet by thirty-eight feet and has a slate covered gable roof. It was used as a school until 1958.

The building was restored in 2004-2006 and houses the Lower Saucon Township Historical Society Museum.

It was added to the National Register of Historic Places in 2008.

References

External links
Lower Saucon Township Historical Society website

History museums in Pennsylvania
One-room schoolhouses in Pennsylvania
School buildings on the National Register of Historic Places in Pennsylvania
School buildings completed in 1880
Defunct schools in Pennsylvania
Schools in Northampton County, Pennsylvania
Museums in Northampton County, Pennsylvania
1880 establishments in Pennsylvania
National Register of Historic Places in Northampton County, Pennsylvania